The Pretenders (original Norwegian title: Kongs-Emnerne) is a dramatic play by Norwegian playwright Henrik Ibsen.

Play overview
The Pretenders was written in bursts during 1863, but Ibsen claimed to have had sources and the idea in 1858. It is a five-act play in prose set in the thirteenth century. The play opened at the old Christiania Theatre on 19 January 1864. The plot revolves around the historical conflict between Norwegian King Håkon Håkonsson and his father-in-law, Earl Skule Bårdsson. It has been commonly ascribed to the rivalry between Ibsen and Bjørnstjerne Bjørnson, who had  succeeded Ibsen as director of the Norske Theater in 1857.

List of characters
 Håkon Håkonsson, King-elect of Norway
 Inga of Varteig, Håkon's mother
 Earl Skule Bårdsson, Norwegian nobleman and future father-in-law of Håkon
 Lady Ragnhild, Skule's wife
 Sigrid, Skule's sister
 Margaret, Skule's daughter and Håkon's future wife
 Guthorm Ingesson
 Sigurd Ribbung
 Nikolas Arnesson, Bishop of Oslo
 Dagfinn the Peasant, Håkon's Marshal
 Ivar Bodde, Haakon's Chaplain
 Vegard Vaeradal, one of his bodyguard
 Gregorius Jonsson, a nobleman
 Paul Flida, a nobleman
 Ingebjorg, wife of Anders Skialdarband
 Peter, her son, a young priest
 Sira Viljam, house chaplain to Bishop Nikolas
 Master Sigard of Brabant, a physician
 Jatgeir, an Icelandic poet
 Baard Bratte, a chieftain from near Trondheim

Historic background
Håkon Håkonsson reigned as king of Norway from 1217 to 1263. In the earlier part of the reign of King Håkon, much of the royal power was in the hands of Skule Bårdsson. In 1225, Håkon married Skule's daughter Margaret Skulesdatter. The relationship between the two became strained as Håkon asserted his power. In 1239, the conflict between the two erupted into open warfare when Skule had himself proclaimed king. The rebellion ended in 1240 when Skule was put to death. This rebellion and the death of Skule are generally taken to mark the end of the Civil war era in Norway which had dated from 1130.

Translations
This play was translated into English by Scottish writer and critic William Archer as a part of his publication, Henrik Ibsen's Prose Dramas Vol III. This volume consisted of Lady Inger of Östrat (Fru Inger til Østeraad), The Vikings at Helgeland (Hærmændene paa Helgeland), and The Pretenders (Kongs-Emnerne). It was published by The Walter Scott Company, London in 1890.

This play was translated into Welsh (as Yr Ymhonwyr) by T. Gwynn Jones, and performed to an audience of 10,000 at the 1927 Holyhead National Eisteddfod. The production was part of the national drama movement in Wales, funded by Baron Howard de Walden.

References

Further reading
Ferguson, Robert (1996) Henrik Ibsen: A New Biography (Richard Cohen Books) 
Postlewait, Thomas  (1984) William Archer on Ibsen, The Major Essays, 1889-1919 (London: Greenwood Press)  ]
McFarlane, James  (1994) The Cambridge Companion to Ibsen  (Cambridge University Press) 

Plays by Henrik Ibsen